The Dr. John Vermeule House, also known as the Vermeule–Mundy House, is a historic building located at 223 Rock Avenue in Green Brook Township of Somerset County, New Jersey. It was added to the National Register of Historic Places on February 20, 2013, for its significance in architecture.

History and description
The vernacular frame Federal style house was built  by Dr. John Vermeule (1768–1813), who had inherited the property from his grandfather, Cornelius Vermeule (1716–1784), a member of the Second Continental Congress in 1775. His father, Adrian Vermeule (1741–1777), was captured in January 1777 during the American Revolutionary War and died a prisoner of war in the sugar house prisons in New York City. Some timbers used to build the house have been dated to 1787 using dendrochronology. His son, John M. Vermeule (1801-1833), later inherited the property, but had to sell it in 1824 to James Vail (1773–1850). In 1855, it was purchased by Morris Cohen, who sold it in 1868 to land investors, Michael F. Marcley and Martin M. Thorn. A farmer, Abram Pool Voorhies (1845–19l2), was living here by 1900. Green Brook Township purchased the property from Gilbert I. Mundy in 2008.

See also
 National Register of Historic Places listings in Somerset County, New Jersey

References

Green Brook Township, New Jersey
Houses in Somerset County, New Jersey
Federal architecture in New Jersey
Houses completed in 1800
1800 establishments in New Jersey
National Register of Historic Places in Somerset County, New Jersey
Houses on the National Register of Historic Places in New Jersey
New Jersey Register of Historic Places